Curtin Ministry may refer to:

 First Curtin Ministry
 Second Curtin Ministry